Count Jan Wielopolski (died 1668) was a Polish noble (szlachcic).

Son of District Judge and Podkomorzy Kasper Wielopolski and Elżbieta Broniewska. He was married to Zofia Kochanowska.

He was a courtier from 1635, administrator of royal salt-pits in Bochnia from 1649, castellan of Wojnicz from 1655 and voivode of Kraków Voivodship from 1667.

Starost of Biecz, Warsaw, Bochnia and Nowy Targ.

Counts of Poland
Jan the elder
17th-century births
1688 deaths